The 23rd Sarasaviya Awards festival (Sinhala: 23වැනි සරසවිය සම්මාන උලෙළ), presented by the Associated Newspapers of Ceylon Limited, was held to honor the best films of 1994 Sinhala cinema on August 12, 1995, at the Bandaranaike Memorial International Conference Hall, Colombo 07, Sri Lanka. Her Excellency The President Chandrika Kumaratunga was the chief guest at the awards night.

The film Nomiyena Minisun won the six prestigious awards including Best Film.

Awards

References

Sarasaviya Awards
Sarasaviya